Christopher Alfred Goode (born 22 April 1989), better known as Chris Cross, is an English magician, escapologist and former contortionist. He has performed worldwide and appeared on British television. He was born on 1989 at Newcastle General Hospital in Newcastle-Upon-Tyne, England.

Early years 
He learnt his first ever magic trick, The Coin Vanisher aged 10, and when he was 13, he performed for tips semi-professionally at various Newcastle city centre bars, casinos, and nightclubs. He developed a stage act incorporating comedy, magic, and his natural ability of dislocation and contortion which he performed as a street show. As well, as a cabaret at various holiday parks on the south coast of England. 
At age 16, he left school to become a full-time entertainer.

Career 
Cross now performs close-up magic and cabaret acts of escapology, but he has retired as a contortionist due to arthritis in his shoulders as a result of performing his dislocation act for over 10 years. He won the UK Cabaret Championship 'Beat the Wand' Trophy at The Blackpool Magic Convention in the Blackpool Wintergardens at the 'Blackpool Magic Convention' in 2009. He was also nominated for Young Businessman and Entrepreneur of the Year by the Evening Chronicle newspaper.
The majority of Cross's performing is now at festivals, private and corporate events in the UK. 
In 2014 and 2015 he won the title Best North East Wedding Entertainer (Non-Musical) from the UK Wedding Industry Awards. He also Won Best Wedding Fair Exhibitor as voted for by the public at the Stadium of Light in 2014 and at St James' Park in 2016. Cross won the award for Outstanding Customer Service at the North of England Wedding Awards 2014 organised by The Wedding Guide and again in 2016 winning the Judge's Choice award at York Racecourse. He was also nominated for The Journal's North East Culture Awards in 2016.

A regular on the independent festival scene, Cross has performed at numerous events across the country, including Glastonbury, Kendal Calling, T in the Park, Hard Rock Calling, The North East Chilli Festival and BOMFest,

Cross has performed his one-man stand-up comedy contortion and escapology show with titles Chris Cross is Escaping from Reality, Loose Cannon and Cunning Stunts over 100 times between 2008 and 2016 at the Voodoo Rooms during the Edinburgh Fringe Festival, gaining 4-star reviews from Broadway Baby and others.

In September 2010, Cross acted as the compere for the Liverpool Tattoo Convention to general praise, which resulted in Cross returning on four more occasions for the Convention.
In the same year Cross was booked to appear at The Bahrain International Circuit Formula One in Bahrain, The World Buskers Festival in Christchurch New Zealand, The Slipper Room in New York City, as well as various Cabaret Clubs in Paris, London and Los Angeles. Cross also appeared on Greek TV in May 2010, where he was a semi-finalist on Greece's Got Talent.

Cross has entertained numerous celebrities with his magic tricks and performances, including: Tulisa of NDubz at the launch of KAZAM mobile phones at The Raffles Club in Chelsea, DJ Yella of NWA backstage at a gig in Dublin, Miles Kane, lead singer in The Last Shadow Puppets with Alex Turner of The Arctic Monkeys, William Shatner known as Captain James Kirk from TV Sci-Fi Show Star Trek at a Sci-fi convention in Manchester and The Prince of Wales.
Cross is also endorsed by various Royal Warrant holders, including Thresher & Glenny Outfitters of London, Globetrotter Luggage and other companies, such as Gaziano Girling of Saville Row, London.
Cross challenged former two-time undisputed boxing Heavyweight Champion of the World, Mike Tyson, to a contest of strength. Tyson had 90 seconds to tie Cross up using all of his strength, and Cross had 90 seconds to use all of his strength to make the escape, in which he succeeded. After the Fun Challenge, Tyson appeared on ESPN's Sportsnation TV Show in America where they played a clip of the stunt. Mike said He was one Crazy Dude, he had me feeling in Danger of my Life and stuff!
This led to a string of other challenges, including proving he was faster than Sugar Ray Leonard, with Leonard saying You're too Fast for me, Chris! and challenging Jeremy Bulloch who played Boba Fett in the original Star Wars trilogy to chain him up. Cross escaped, claiming I Escaped from the Greatest Bounty Hunter in the Galaxy! Cross then went on to Challenge former Green Cross Code Man, David Prowse who played Darth Vader in the original Star Wars trilogy too, saying he wanted to prove the Force was stronger with him than Vader. He demonstrated some 'mind control' appearing card tricks to Prowse, who said The Force was with Chris – Not me!

He also performed at the Jongleurs/Highlight comedy clubs with Bob Slayer's 'Rock & Roll Circus' in December 2010.

Cross has notably performed upside-down straitjacket escape stunts both on TV and at events. He was tied in a straitjacket and suspended by his ankles, upside-down, from a crane over the Newport River in Wales at the Big Splash Festival and the following year performed another upside-down straitjacket escape off the bridge itself over the river. Cross also performed this stunt hanging over 100 ft in the air from the top of the Newcastle Castle Keep as a tribute to one of his heroes Harry Houdini, which made the front page of The Journal Newspaper.

Recent years 
In 2013 Cross appeared on Bafta Award-winning Children's TV Show The Slammer, Hosted by Ted Robbins, on CBBC with an escapology stunt he created himself, involving chains, padlocks and a trapdoor on a platform which opened onto sharp spikes. It was originally performed on Greece's Got Talent TV Show in Greece and Cross was asked to duplicate the stunt for the British TV Show. In the same year, Cross was hired by BBC Worldwide as the magic and escapology consultant on The Hairy Bikers stage tour. He had to teach them some basic escapology for their live stage show, and Cross also supported Brit-Pop BAND Simon & Oscar from Ocean Colour Scene at a gig in Newcastle.

In 2014 he appeared on BBC One on The One Show alongside Gyles Brandreth where Cross performed an upside-down straitjacket escape and chatted about famous British escapologist, Allan Allan, who had just died. American illusionists Penn and Teller also appeared on the same show.

On 27 July 2014, Chris Cross was the last-ever act to perform at the original Spanish City Dome in Whitley Bay, before builders went underway with the re-developments. The Dome was a venue for many Entertainers and Bands over the last century, including The Animals. It was the inspiration for the Dire Straits song "Romeo and Juliet". Alan Clark (keyboardist) even sent a message to Cross to read out on the evening of the last show.
One year later, in 2015, an inflatable dome venue was inflated next to the actual dome to stage The Under the Dome Festival 2015 and Cross was the closing act here too.

In August 2015, Cross organised and promoted and co-starred in Geordie Legends: Them off The Viz! at The Tyne Theatre celebrating 30 years of the iconic Geordie Comic, VIZ, being in national distribution. Co-founders of the Comic, brothers Chris Donald and Simon Donald both attended and took part in a Q&A's on stage with Fans. The evening was sold out, so a second date was added, which sold out too. £1,525.00 was raised from the evenings and donated to local charity St. Oswalds Hospice.
To Commemorate the show, Chris Donald created a comic strip called Chris Cross – He's at a Loss (as to how to become a VIZ Comic Character!) which saw Chris Cross the magician meeting famous VIZ characters in each frame, such as The Fat Slags, Roger Mellie and Felix and his Amazing Underpants. 200 limited edition prints were printed and signed by both Cross and Donald and sold on the evening of the Shows.
Simon Donald also had Cross appearing in a charity fundraiser for Dyslexia North East at a later date.

On 18 June 2015, Cross organised, promoted and co-starred in The Chris Cross & Paul Daniels Magic Show featuring The Lovely Debbie McGee! at his Quayside Cabaret Club in Newcastle. Paul Daniels was one of Cross's inspirations, and Paul gave him various advice and constructive criticism over the years. 
Following the sold-out show in 2015, Paul, Cross and Debbie McGee were scheduled to play a mini-tour of just a few dates mid-2016 in the North of England. 
Following Paul's death, Cross staged a tribute to Paul Daniels at his Quayside Cabaret Club in Newcastle Upon Tyne on 19 May. The event raised £1,235.00 for brain tumour research. Debbie McGee said she was Very moved and touched that Chris decided to put on a tribute to Paul and publicly thanked Cross on her radio show on BBC Radio Berkshire. The show was promoted on Good Morning Britain on ITV, BBC Radio Newcastle, Metro Radio and in The Newcastle Evening Chronicle Newspaper.

In January 2016, Cross broke the fifth metacarpal on his right hand whilst rehearsing a new escapology stunt, which meant he had to learn lots of his tricks one handed to get him through gigs that were booked in whilst his right hand was recovering. He broke it by accidentally hitting it on a marble table in his living room whilst rehearsing a stunt for The Greatest Show on the Tyne.

In August 2016, Cross made Front Page News on the Journal Newspaper, as well as other regional press, when he performed an upside-down straitjacket escape, hanging over 100 ft in the air by his ankles above the roof of Newcastle's Castle Keep in a tribute stunt to Harry Houdini, who also visited the roof of the castle keep on his visit to the region in 1920. Geordie Actress Charlie Hardwick assisted Cross in the stunt too.
 
On 7 September 2016, Cross was hired to support Geordie Rockstar and lead singer of British band The Animals, Eric Burdon at a gig which took place at Newcastle City Hall. During his warm-up act a drunken audience member tried to get on to the stage to start a fight with Chris. The intoxicated audience member was escorted off the premises by event security. The cause of the upset was a joke delivered by Cross about the audience member sitting in the cheap seats. 

In February 2017, Cross organised Purely Belter - The 18th Birthday Party. Purely Belter is one of Cross's favourite films and he decided to host an 18th anniversary to celebrate the release of the Geordie cult movie. This saw a Q&A session and a re-union of the cast including actors: Tim Healy, Chris Beattie, Greg McClane, Val McLane (Sister of Jimmy Nail), Charlie Richmond, Charlie Hardwick & other cast members. The event raised £2,000 for local charities.

In May 2017, Cross staged An Evening with The Bounty Hunter featuring actor Jeremy Bulloch who played the part of Boba Fett in the original Star Wars Trilogy, most notably in the Empire Strikes Back Movie. Jeremy appeared on the Evening with show in Newcastle, which consisted of a screening of a Star Wars film, as well as a Q&A with Jeremy in front of a live audience. Jeremy & his wife stayed with Cross at his home in Newcastle on the night of the event.

In September 2017, Tim Healy invited Cross on set of Still Open All Hours, a British sitcom based on the original Ronnie Barker Open All Hours Comedy TV Show. They were recording the Christmas special in Scarborough. Cross performed for the cast and crew, including Sir David Jason. 
In October 2017, Rothbury Auction House sold a vintage dressing screen that once belonged to Rod Clements, a member of the band Lindisfarne (band), who wrote the folk hit song Meet Me on the Corner. The screen was used on the vinyl single record cover for the song. Cross won the auction, bidding against others from outside of the region. He said he thought it was important that a piece of Geordie history should stay in Newcastle.

The Geordie Book and DVD of Magic 

Chris Cross became an author of The Geordie Book of Magic in 2017. The book features illustrations by Davey Jones from The Viz Comic and a foreword by Debbie McGee, widow of the late famous British magician Paul Daniels. The book teaches a dozen North-East themed magic tricks and includes special tricks cards, along with a DVD showing performances and explanations how to do each trick. The DVD features many Geordie stars, including actor Tim Healy, actress Charlie Hardwick, Ray Laidlaw the drummer from Lindisfarne (band), English former professional football Malcolm Macdonald aka Supermac and other notable North-East celebrities.

The Greatest Show on the Tyne 
Cross is the owner, artistic director and creator of The Greatest Show on the Tyne

In 2010 Cross set up his own cabaret show at Madame JoJo's in Soho, London – The Carny Cabaret Show.
He hosted the show and hired in cabaret performers from around the UK to perform alongside him, mostly local London performers such as Bruce Airhead, Kiki Lovechild, Equador the Wizard, Frisky and Mannish, Lorraine Bowen and Sophia Landi.

This show ran for six dates before moving nationwide.

From May 2012 the Carny Cabaret was gigging a bi-monthly residency at Alexander's Jazz Theatre in Chester Throughout 2011, the show ran for corporate functions, including Microsoft and at The Grosvenor Casino.

In 2015 the show was re-branded as The Quayside Cabaret Club and moved to a restaurant in Newcastle upon Tyne, where every show sold out and critics gave it positive reviews.

On 2 September 2016, the bi-monthly show changed its name to The Greatest Show on the Tyne and became an annual show to take place every year at The Tyne Theatre and Opera House, which is the oldest working Victorian theatre in the world and has a capacity of 1,100 people.

In an article in NE1 Magazine he was referred to as The North-East's King of Variety & In the North-East Theatre Guide, the reviewer described the show as a Northern Saturday Night at The Palladium.

The Greatest Show on the Tyne was repeated as planned in 2017 with all new acts and it is planned to take place again in November 2018 with a brand new line-up, once again.

References

External links
Chris Cross Official Website

1989 births
Living people
English television personalities